The Kalawaig River is a river of the Philippines. It is a tributary of the Cagayan River.

Rivers of the Philippines
Landforms of Misamis Oriental